Celebrate Me Home is the debut studio album by American singer-songwriter Kenny Loggins, released in 1977. The album, Loggins' first since splitting from Loggins and Messina, represents a slight move away from the folk-rock leanings of his previous recordings towards a more polished, soft rock sound.

Featuring production by famed Billy Joel collaborator Phil Ramone and jazz keyboardist Bob James, Celebrate Me Home peaked at number 27 on the Billboard album charts, and was eventually certified platinum by the RIAA. Loggins would experience even greater commercial and chart success with his next album release, Nightwatch.

Two singles were released from this album. The first was "I Believe In Love", reaching number 66 on the Billboard Hot 100.  The track was covered by Barbra Streisand a year earlier for A Star Is Born (1976 soundtrack).  The second and final single, "Celebrate Me Home" (edited to 3:51), was released at the end of 1977, but did not chart.

Track listing
Side One
"Lady Luck" (Kenny Loggins, lyrics: John Townsend) – 4:40
"If You Be Wise" (Loggins, lyrics: Jimmy Webb) – 4:25
"I Believe in Love" (Loggins, lyrics: Alan Bergman, Marilyn Bergman) – 3:30  (#66 US) 
"Set It Free" (Eva Ein, Loggins) – 5:56
"Why Do People Lie" (Ein, Loggins) – 4:29

Side Two
"Enter My Dream" (Loggins) – 5:20
"I've Got the Melody (Deep in My Heart)" (Patti Austin) – 4:12
"Celebrate Me Home" (Bob James, Loggins) – 4:42
"Daddy's Back" (Ein, David Foster, Loggins) – 3:32
"You Don't Know Me" (Eddy Arnold, Cindy Walker) – 4:14

Personnel 
 Kenny Loggins – lead vocals, backing vocals (1-8)
 Bob James – keyboards (1-9), Fender Rhodes (10), horn and string arrangements, musical direction 
 Richard Tee – organ (8)
 Hiram Bullock – electric guitar solo (1)
 Lee Ritenour – acoustic guitar (1), electric guitar (1, 3, 4, 8), bouzouki (1), mandolin (1)
 Tommy Tedesco – bouzouki (1), mandola (1), mandolin (1)
 Eric Gale – electric guitar (2, 7-10)
 Steve Khan – acoustic guitar (2), electric guitar (7)
 Robben Ford – acoustic guitar (3), electric guitar (4, 5, 6, 9)
 Hugh McCracken – acoustic guitar (3, 6)
 Dean Parks – acoustic guitar (4, 5), electric guitar (4, 5)
 George Hawkins – bass guitar (1-9), backing vocals (1-8)
 Harvey Mason – drums (1, 3-6, 8, 9)
 Steve Gadd – drums (2, 7)
 Steve Forman – percussion (1, 4, 5, 6, 9)
 Ralph MacDonald – percussion (1), tambourine (3, 7, 8), cabasa (5), congas (5, 7), cowbell (7)
 Laudir de Oliveira – percussion (4, 5, 6, 9)
 Jon Clarke – sopranino recorder solo (3), saxophones (5, 9), woodwinds (5, 9), flute (6), alto flute (6), bass flute (6), clarinet (6), bass clarinet (6), oboe (6), English horn (6), recorder (6), horn arrangements
 Vince Denham – alto sax solo (5), woodwinds (5, 9), flute (6), alto flute (6), clarinet (6), bass clarinet (6), saxophones (9), horn arrangements
 Patti Austin – backing vocals (2, 4, 6), harmony vocals (7)
 Lani Groves – backing vocals (2, 4, 6)
 Gwen Guthrie – backing vocals (2, 4, 6)
 Bill Eaton – choral arrangement (8)

Production 
 Producers – Bob James and Phil Ramone
 Engineer – Phil Ramone
 Assistant Engineers – Jim Boyer, Frank Jones and Andy MacDonald.
 Recorded at Warner Bros. Recording Studios (Burbank, CA) and A&R Recording (New York City, NY).
 Design – Tom Steele
 Photography – Ed Caraeff 
 Lettering – Martin Donald

Notes

External links 
 

1977 debut albums
Kenny Loggins albums
Albums produced by Bob James (musician)
Albums produced by Phil Ramone
Columbia Records albums